The 2009 NCAA Division II Football Championship Game was held on December 12, 2009 at Braly Municipal Stadium near the campus of the University of North Alabama in Florence, Alabama.

Playoffs

The 2009 NCAA Division II National Football Championship playoffs involved 24 schools playing in a single-elimination tournament to determine the national champion of NCAA Division II college football.

The tournament began on November 14, 2009, and concluded on December 12, 2009 at Braly Municipal Stadium near the campus of the University of North Alabama in Florence, Alabama.

References

Championship Game
NCAA Division II Football Championship Games
Grand Valley State Lakers football games
Northwest Missouri State Bearcats football games
NCAA Division II Football Championship Game
NCAA Division II Football Championship Game